A home front or homefront is the civilian populace of the nation at war as an active support system for its military.

 American Civil War
 Economic history of the American Civil War
 Economy of the Confederate States of America
 Home front during World War I
 German occupation of Belgium during World War I
 Economic history of World War I
 History of Germany during World War I#Home front
 History of the United Kingdom during the First World War
 United States home front during World War I
 Home front during World War II
 Australian home front during World War II
 German occupation of Belgium during World War II
 Canada in World War II#Home front
 German military administration in occupied France during World War II
 Vichy France
 Nazi Germany
 Netherlands in World War II
 Pacific Islands home front during World War II
 Occupation of Poland (1939–1945)
 Polish culture during World War II
 United Kingdom home front during World War II
 United States home front during World War II
 Women in the World Wars
 Women in World War I
 Women in World War II

Homefront or Home front may also refer to:

Military 
 Home Front Command, an Israeli military command

Film and television 
 The Home Front (1940 film), a Canadian documentary short directed by Stanley Hawes
 Homefront (2013 film), an American action-thriller directed by Gary Fleder
 Home Front (2020 film), a French drama directed by Lucas Belvaux
 Home Front (1988 film), a 1988 British television film by Nick McCarty in the anthology series ScreenPlay
 Home Front (TV series), a lifestyle television series airing on TVNZ's channel Television One
 Homefront (1994 TV series), British BBC TV show series about interior design
 Homefront (American TV series), 1990s American ABC TV show series set in the 1940s
 Homefront (2012 TV series), British ITV drama about the wives of soldiers fighting in Afghanistan
 "Homefront" (Brothers & Sisters episode), episode of Brothers & Sisters TV series
 "Homefront" (Star Trek: Deep Space Nine), episode from the fourth season of the television series Star Trek: Deep Space Nine
 "Homefront", episode from the thirteen season of the television series NCIS
 "The Home Front" (The 4400), episode of the science fiction television series The 4400
 The Home Front, a 1943 animated short in the Private Snafu series

Literature 
 Homefront, a 1986 book by Patti Davis, née Reagan; see 
 Homefront, a 2005 novel by Chuck Logan
 The Home Front, a 1932 book by Sylvia Pankhurst
 "Mars: The Home Front", a 1996 short story by George Alec Effinger

Radio 
 Home Front (BBC radio series), BBC Radio 4 drama set in Britain during World War I
 Homefront, the former title of the radio program, Today's Homeowner with Danny Lipford

Video games 
 Homefront (video game), a video game released in 2011
 Homefront: The Revolution, a 2016 video game (a reboot of the first Homefront)